Wolfgang Burmann Sánchez (born 1940) is an art director of Spanish-German origin, who has directed various films, television series and plays. He is the winner of the 1988 Goya Award for Best Art Direction for the film Remando al viento (Rowing with the Wind). He is the son of designer and artistic director Sigfrido Burmann and brother of cinematographer Hans Burmann.

Awards and nominations

References

External links 
 

Goya Award winners
Living people
Spanish art directors
1940 births